The Taichung Confucian Temple is a Confucian temple in North District, Taichung, Taiwan.

History
The construction of the temple began in 1972 and completed in 1976.

Architecture
The temple was constructed in Song Dynasty architectural style following the layout of Qufu Confucian Temple in Shandong. It sits in a 20,000 m2 of complex area.

Transportation
The temple is within walking distance, north of Taichung Station of Taiwan Railways.

See also
 Temple of Confucius
 List of temples in Taichung
 List of temples in Taiwan
 Religion in Taiwan

References

1976 establishments in Taiwan
Taichung
Religious buildings and structures completed in 1976
Temples in Taichung